Nerdcore Rising is the official debut album by nerdcore rapper MC Frontalot. The album was first released on August 27, 2005 at the Penny Arcade Expo.

It consists of 16 tracks; six new tracks and ten "classic megahits" that Frontalot had previously made available through his website. Vocals for each of the old songs have been re-recorded, and production on these tracks range from slight variation on the original to drastic revisions.

The voice of the "preacher" character in the song "Indier Than Thou" was provided by Remy Auberjonois, son of René Auberjonois, the actor who portrayed Odo on the science fiction series Star Trek: Deep Space Nine.

Track listing

Credits
Andrew Griffin – drums
Brandon "Blak Lotus" Patton – vocals, bass guitar, tuba
Campbell Whyte – additional illustrations
Dan "The Categorical Imperative" Thiel – drums
Euclides "Yook" Pereyra – vocals
Gabriel "Gminor7" Alter – keyboard, vocals
John Nolt – cello
Matt Steckler – saxophone
Remy Auberjonois - Preacher voice
Sean McArdle – guitar
Tony Moore – cover illustration

External links
 Official Nerdcore Rising web page with samples and lyrics
 
 Nerdcore Rising, the film

2005 albums
MC Frontalot albums